This is a list of elementary schools in the U.S. state of Hawaii.

Honolulu

Public

Solomon Elementary School
Solomon Elementary's namesake was a member of the Wolfhounds. The dedication of the original campus was on November 11, 1969 while the dedication of the current facility occurred on November 9, 2019. In the 2016-2017 school year it had 933 students. The Department of Defense’s Office of Economic Adjustment funded the construction of the current campus with a $70,248,901. The State of Hawaii added an additional $20,000,000 to the funding. The current campus has four buildings, with each up to two stories tall, and a capacity of above 800. These buildings have 63 classrooms total.

Inouye Elementary School
Inouye Elementary opened in 1959 as Hale Kula Elementary School, and it was given its current name on April 19, 2016.

Pearl Harbor Elementary School
In 2003 the Hawaii Senate  voted $2,500,000 to plan, design, and construct a library for the school.

The Hawaii Federal Fire Department chose this school to launch the 2004 Fire Prevention Week on October 5, 2004.

Kindergarten teacher Ruth Komatsu was named in January 1997 as one of Hawaii's Top Teachers.

Notable alumni:
 Deborah Wiles, children's author.<ref>"Children's Book Author Deborah Wiles", Deborah Wiles, accessed 29 December 2007</ref>

Red Hill Elementary School
The campus boasts two 1976 sculptures by Claude Horan, Hoolaulea and Cecil''.

Red Hill Elementary has recognized as a 2014 National Blue Ribbon School.

Private
Hawaii Baptist Academy, Honolulu
ʻIolani School, Honolulu
Kamehameha Schools, Honolulu
Le Jardin Academy, Kailua
Maryknoll School, Honolulu
Mid-Pacific Institute, Honolulu
Myron B. Thompson Academy, Honolulu
Punahou School, Honolulu
Sacred Hearts Academy, Honolulu
Saint Andrew's Priory School for Girls, Honolulu

Greater Oahu

Public

Private
Honolulu Waldorf School, Kahala
Le Jardin Academy, Kailua

Niihau

Kauai

Public

Private
Island School, Līhue
Kahili Adventist School, Koloa

Molokai

Lānaʻi 
The only school in Lānaʻi is Lānaʻi High & Elementary School.

Maui

Public

Private
Kamehameha Schools Maui Campus, Pukalani
Seabury Hall College Preparatory School, Makawao

Big Island

Public

Private
Hawaii Academy of Arts and Sciences, Pahoa
Hawaiʻi Preparatory Academy, Kamuela
Hualalai Academy, Kailua Kona
Kamehameha Schools Hawaii Campus, Keaau
Ke Kula o Nāwahīokalaniōpuu, Keaau
Kona Christian Academy, Kailua Kona
Parker School, Kamuela
St. Joseph School (Hilo, Hawaii), Hilo

See also
List of high schools in Hawaii
List of middle schools in Hawaii
Hawaii State Department of Education, sole centralized school district for the state

References

External links
List of elementary schools in Hawaii from SchoolTree.org
Hawaii Department of Education list of public schools

Elementary
Hawaii